Shoji or Shōji may refer to:

 Shōji, a type of Japanese room partition with a wooden frame holding a wooden or bamboo grid
 Shōji (era), a Japanese era name spanning the years from April 1199 through February 1201
 Shōji (given name), a masculine Japanese given name

People with the surname
, Japanese murderer
 Tarō Shōji, a Japanese ryūkōka singer
, Japanese ice hockey player
, Japanese footballer
, Japanese volleyball player

Japanese-language surnames